Aghasi (also Romanized as Āghāsī; also known as Āghāsī Maḩalleh) is a village in Haviq Rural District, Haviq District, Talesh County, Gilan Province, Iran. At the 2006 census, its population was 248, in 48 families.

References 

Populated places in Talesh County